Sir William Henry Doyle (born 1823, Nassau, Bahamas) is believed to be the first (1873) Bahamian knighted by a British monarch. He was appointed Chief Justice of the Bahamas on the 20th October 1864, after the resignation of John Campbell Lees. He held the position of Assistant Justice of the General Court before his promotion to Chief Justice of The Bahamas, a position he was appointed to in 1858. 

In March 1875, he was appointed as Chief Justice of the Leeward Islands and later appointed as Chief Justice of Gibraltar from 1877 to 1879.

References 

Chief justices of Gibraltar
Year of death missing
1823 births
People from Nassau, Bahamas
Chief justices of the Bahamas
19th-century Gibraltarian judges